Asegaon, also known as Asegoan Devi, is a small village in Babhulgaon tahsil of Yavatmal district of Maharashtra in India. It contains a temple of the goddess Durga known as Goan Devi, and a small temple of Bhavani Mata . 
Recently the temple was beautifully renovated by Mr. Satish Pimpale. Moreover, residential facility for pilgrims are yet to be developed and are planned in near future.

Big temple jagadamba temple.
Recently the temple was beautifully renovated by jagadmba trust

Reaching Asegaon
One can reach Asegaon from Yavatmal, Amravati, Nagpur via Babhulgaon.Babhulgaon ST Stand which is on junction of state highway #236 and state highway #237 on the Yavatmal- Amravati road. 
A small diversion at around 2.0 km from Babhulgaon on Yavatmal-Amravati road towards Yavatmal leading to Rani Amravati goes to Asegaon.
Asegaon is at a distance of around 15.0 km from Babhulgaon ST Stand.
Distance between Yavatmal ST Stand to Babhulgaon is 21.5 km 
Distance between Wardha ST Stand to Babhulgaon via Kalam is 72.0 km

Bhavani Mata Temple
The Bhavni Mata temple is a small but beautiful temple. 
The daily worship is carried out by the family of Vijay Joshi.
Another goddess temple is also located in the village which is the gaon devi temple.

People
The main occupation is agriculture.
Most of the people work in fields during the day so the village is a quiet place throughout the day.

See also

 Asegaon Devi
 Rani Amravati

Villages in Yavatmal district